The 1843 Georgia gubernatorial election was held on October 2, 1843.

The Whig candidate George W. Crawford defeated the Democratic challenger Mark A. Cooper and was elected Governor. 

The election was decided by 3,338 votes.

General election

Candidates

Whig 

 George W. Crawford, former house representative.

Democratic 

 Mark Anthony Cooper, former house representative.

Results

References 

Georgia
Georgia (U.S. state) gubernatorial elections
Gubernatorial